News plus, stylized as News+, was an evening Filipino newscast on S+A which was aired from January 20 to December 26, 2014, replacing Iba-Balita. It is anchored by Anthony Taberna. Taberna joins with Jef Gaitan as the program's showbiz segment host.

The program deviated from traditional news programs as it will provide an in-depth views of daily news and events.

By the end of 2014, however, the program was cancelled on December 26 (six days before New Year's Day celebration) as the station makes its transition into a fully fledged sports channel, leaving the hourly update Fast Break as the only remaining source of news for S+A until it was cancelled on January 29, 2017 in favor of additional sports coverages.

Anchors
Main anchor
Anthony Taberna

Substitute anchors
Jasmin Romero
Jing Castañeda
Maan Macapagal
TJ Manotoc
Johnson Manabat
Jorge Cariño

Segment host
Jef Gaitan (Showbiz News Segment Anchor)

See also
 List of programs aired by ABS-CBN Sports and Action

References

ABS-CBN Sports and Action news shows
ABS-CBN Sports and Action original programming
Philippine television news shows
2014 Philippine television series debuts
2014 Philippine television series endings
Filipino-language television shows